William Stedman (born 5 December 1999) is a New Zealand para-athlete, competing in sprints, middle-distance running and long jump events.

Biography 
Stedman attended Middleton Grange School in Christchurch, New Zealand. He currently studies engineering at The University of Canterbury. 

He represented New Zealand at the 2016 Summer Paralympics in Rio de Janeiro, where he won bronze medals in the men's 400 metres T36 and 800 metres T36.

In the 800 metres event of the 2017 World Para Athletics Championships in London he won the silver medal with a time of 2:11.86 after he achieved a seasonal and personal best of 2:11.68 that year.

In 2020 Stedman represented New Zealand at the 2020 Summer Paralympics in Tokyo, Japan. He won the silver medal in the long jump T36 and the bronze medal in the 400 metres T36. He married his wife Annika Stedman on the 29th January of 2022. William is brother to Luke and Isabelle Stedman, and brother-in-law to Sarah Duke.

Personal bests

Awards and recognition 
Stedman was named 2015 Para Athlete of the Year by Sport Canterbury and in 2016 he was named Junior Sportsperson of the Year by ParaFed Canterbury. In 2017 he was named Junior Athlete of the Year at the Canterbury Athletics Awards and also shared the Middle Distance Athlete of the Year award with Angie Petty. In 2020 he was named Para Athlete of the Year at the Canterbury Athletics Awards.

References

External links
  (archive)
 

1999 births
Living people
New Zealand male sprinters
New Zealand male middle-distance runners
New Zealand male long jumpers
Paralympic athletes of New Zealand
Athletes (track and field) at the 2016 Summer Paralympics
Medalists at the 2016 Summer Paralympics
Medalists at the 2020 Summer Paralympics
Paralympic silver medalists for New Zealand
Paralympic bronze medalists for New Zealand
Paralympic medalists in athletics (track and field)
People educated at Middleton Grange School
Athletes (track and field) at the 2020 Summer Paralympics